Barton Holan Bryant (November 18, 1962 – May 31, 2022) was an American professional golfer who played on the PGA Tour and PGA Tour Champions.

Early life 
Bryant was born in Gatesville, Texas, the son of a Baptist pastor.  He attended New Mexico State University, where he was a two-time All-American as a member of the golf team.

Professional career 
Bryant turned professional in 1986.

Bryant did not win on the PGA Tour until his 187th start, the 2004 Valero Texas Open. His entire career was plagued by injuries and he graduated from PGA Tour Q School six times before his win. At 41 he was the oldest first time winner on the tour in nine years. In 2005 he won the Memorial Tournament and the season ending Tour Championship to finish ninth on the money list with earnings of $3,249,136, which was more than he had earned in total in his first eighteen seasons on the PGA and Nationwide tours from 1986 to 2003, during which his best money list finish on the main tour was 80th. His good run of form also propelled him into the top-50 of the Official World Golf Ranking.

The win at Memorial was particularly memorable. Bryant's tee shot on the 72nd hole found a hazard. He was able to get it up and down for par and secure his one-shot victory over Fred Couples.

Bryant's elder brother Brad has won on both the PGA Tour and the Champions Tour. 

Bryant won his first Champions Tour event at the 2013 Dick's Sporting Goods Open, making him the 1,000th winner in Champions Tour history.

Personal life 
Bryant was married to the former Cathy Cox for 34 years until she died of brain cancer in April 2017.

Death
Bryant died on May 31, 2022, in a car accident in Polk City, Florida, at the age of 59.

Professional wins (9)

PGA Tour wins (3)

Other wins (3)
1988 Florida Open
1990 North Dakota Open
1994 Florida Open

PGA Tour Champions wins (2)

PGA Tour Champions playoff record (0–2)

Other senior wins (1)
2013 Liberty Mutual Insurance Legends of Golf - Raphael Division (with Ian Baker-Finch)

Results in major championships

CUT = missed the half-way cut
"T" = tied

Results in The Players Championship

CUT = missed the halfway cut
"T" indicates a tie for a place

Results in World Golf Championships

QF, R16, R32, R64 = Round in which player lost in match play
"T" = Tied

See also
1990 PGA Tour Qualifying School graduates
1994 PGA Tour Qualifying School graduates
1995 PGA Tour Qualifying School graduates
1999 PGA Tour Qualifying School graduates
2000 PGA Tour Qualifying School graduates
2002 PGA Tour Qualifying School graduates

References

External links

American male golfers
New Mexico State Aggies men's golfers
PGA Tour golfers
PGA Tour Champions golfers
Golfers from Texas
Golfers from Florida
People from Gatesville, Texas
People from Winter Garden, Florida
Road incident deaths in Florida
1962 births
2022 deaths